Decadence refers to a personal trait, or to the state of a society (or segment of it).

Decadence or Decadent may also refer to:
Decadence (band), a Swedish metal band
Decadence (TV series), a television documentary
Decadence (album), a 2004 album by Head Automatica
"Decadence", a song by Pet Shop Boys from the album Alternative
Decadence, a play by Steven Berkoff
Decadence (film), a 1994 film
 Decadence (novel), A 1925 novel by Maxim Gorky 
Decadent movement, an art movement of the late 19th century
Decadent (U.D.O. album), 2015
Decadent (Threshold album),1999
"Decadence" a song by Disturbed from the album Ten Thousand Fists
"Decadance", a song by Living Colour from the album The Chair in the Doorway
Deca-Dence, a 2020 anime television series